Kawakole is a small town and a Block in Nawada district in the Indian state of Bihar. It is situated about 40 km from Nawada City.  The Block lies in the eastern side of Nawada district and is close to Jamui district and Giridih district of Jharkhand. The primary occupation of Kawakol's residents is agriculture, and this area is well known for its tourist attractions.

History
Kawakole was the Workplace of Loknayak Jai Prakash Narayan. He spent a large part of his life there.

Demographics
In the mid-19th century, many labourers from this region migrated to Mauritius, Reunion Island and various Caribbean islands. The present population 12,198 . Males constitute 6275 of the population and females constitute 5923. Kawakole has an average literacy rate of 56.95%, lower than the state average of 61.80%. Male literacy is 65.65%, and female literacy is 47.81%.

Languages
Magahi is the most commonly spoken language in Kawakole.

Communities
Modis, 
Sunars, Telis, Tamolis, Brahmins, Kushwahas, kahars, Mahuris, Musahars, Chamars, Doms, Yadavs, and Muslims are among the major communities that make up the population of the Kawakole area. The Urdu-speaking Muslim community represents a large section of the people particularly in the Kawakole Block. During British rule a large area of land was owned and cultivated by Muslims. After the partition of India, the majority of Muslim landlords emigrated to Pakistan. Others emigrated to Gaya, Patna, Delhi and Kolkata.

Commerce
The main market of Kawakole is at Bazaar Thana Road. Kawakole's economy is primarily dependent on agriculture. There are three fuel stations and one Domestic Gas Agency in the area. Thana Road area & Ranibazar are an emerging commercial hub.

Industry
Although most industries in Kawakole are small-scale, family-owned businesses, Kawakole is one of the fastest-growing places in the district of Nawada..

Banks
 State Bank of India (Customer Service Point)
 Punjab National Bank (branch and ATM)
 Magadh Gramin Bank
 Co-operative Bank
 LIC (branch)
 SAHARA India (branch)

Cuisine
Kawakole's most popular foods include sangamm, raskadam, anarsa, laai, launglata, jalewi, tilkut, khaaza, gulab jamun and chaat.

Education

Government schools & Prominent education institutes
 Inter School Kawakole
 Girls Middle School
 Middle School, kawakol
 Project Inter Girls School Joravardih, kawakol
 Saraswati Shishu / Vidya Mandir
 Jeevan Jyoti Public School, kawakol
 TSM Avasiya Vikas Vidyalaya, kawakol
 DRPS School, kawakol
 Ambedkar public school, kawakol
 Jesus Jeevan Dhara Bijho, kawakol
 Gyanoday vikas vidyalaya Ranibazar, Kawakol
 An-Noor English School, Kawakol
 Warsi Degree College, Pandey Gangaut

Tourist attraction
 Sarvodya ashram sokhodewra, kawakol
 J.P mountain 
 Machandra waterfall
 Bolta pahad
 Mahavir Janmasthan lachuaar

Railway station
 Nawada railway station is nearest Railway station. Also Jamui Railway Station is nearby Railway Station, but little far from Nawada.

Cinema halls
 Jyoti Picture Palace

Cities and towns in Nawada district